For the tower near Saint-Malo, see Solidor Tower

The Solidor was a German automobile manufactured in Berlin from 1905 until 1907.  It was basically a rebranded Passy-Thellier.

Solidor is also the surname of an illustrator, Jean-François Miniac.

References
David Burgess Wise, The New Illustrated Encyclopedia of Automobiles.

Defunct motor vehicle manufacturers of Germany